The  is a Japanese aerial lift line in Saijō, Ehime, as well as the name of its operator. Opened in 1968, the line climbs to the hillside of Mount Ishizuchi, the tallest mountain in western Japan. It transports hikers, autumn color spectators, shrine visitors, and mountain climbers. There also is a ski resort.

Basic data
Cable length: 
Vertical interval:

See also
List of aerial lifts in Japan

External links
 Official website

Aerial tramways in Japan
Tourist attractions in Ehime Prefecture
Transport in Ehime Prefecture
1968 establishments in Japan